"Sunny Came Home" is a folk-rock song by American musician Shawn Colvin. It is the opening track on her 1996 concept album, A Few Small Repairs, and was released as a CD and cassette single on June 24, 1997. In the United Kingdom, the song was released on the same formats in May 1998.

"Sunny Came Home" was a commercial success, reaching number seven on the US Billboard Hot 100 to become Colvin's first entry and first top-10 single on the chart. In Canada, the song peaked at number three, while in Iceland, it reached number 20. The song was also a critical success, winning both Grammy Award for Record of the Year and Song of the Year and was nominated for Best Female Pop Vocal Performance.

Background and composition

Shawn Colvin was inspired to write the lyrics of "Sunny Came Home" by the painting she had chosen for the album cover, which shows a woman with a lit match in her hand. The song is written in the key of B minor (with its chorus in D major) in common time with a tempo of 84 beats per minute. Colvin's vocals span from F3 to B4 in the song.

Chart performance
"Sunny Came Home" is Colvin's only hit, peaking at number seven on the Billboard Hot 100 in the United States and topped the Billboard Adult Contemporary chart for four weeks. Colvin's record label did not plan to release the track as a retail single until it became an airplay favorite on contemporary hit radio as well as adult contemporary and adult alternative radio stations. "Sunny Came Home" also became a major hit in Canada, reaching number three on the RPM Top Singles chart for two weeks and peaking atop the RPM Adult Contemporary chart for three weeks. Outside North America, the song became a moderate hit, peaking at number 29 in the United Kingdom, number 44 in Australia and number 90 in Germany.

Awards
At the 1998 Grammy Awards, it was named Song of the Year and Record of the Year. Rapper Ol' Dirty Bastard interrupted the Grammy Awards presentation by protesting Puff Daddy beating his group, Wu-Tang Clan, for Best Rap Album that year, saying "Wu-Tang is for the children. We teach the children. You know what I mean?", while Colvin was about to receive her award.

Track listings
All songs were written by Shawn Colvin and John Leventhal unless otherwise noted.

US CD and cassette single
 "Sunny Came Home" – 4:24
 "What I Get Paid For"  – 3:23

UK CD1
 "Sunny Came Home"
 "Get Out of This House" (live)
 "The Facts About Jimmy" (live)
 "You and the Mona Lisa" (live)

UK CD2
 "Sunny Came Home"
 "Tennessee" (live)
 "Ricochet in Time" (live) 
 "Shotgun Down the Avalanche" (live)

UK cassette single
 "Sunny Came Home"
 "You and the Mona Lisa" (live)

European CD single
 "Sunny Came Home"
 "Get Out of This House" (live)

Australian CD single
 "Sunny Came Home"
 "What I Get Paid For" 
 "Every Little Thing He Does Is Magic" 
 "Steady On"
 "Round of Blues" (album version)

Charts

Weekly charts

Year-end charts

Release history

References

External links
 Shawn Colvin's official website.

1996 songs
1997 singles
Columbia Records singles
Grammy Award for Record of the Year
Grammy Award for Song of the Year
Murder ballads
Shawn Colvin songs
Songs written by John Leventhal
Songs written by Shawn Colvin